Tyrrellspass GAA is a Gaelic Athletic Association club located in the town of Tyrrellspass  in County Westmeath, Ireland.

History
The team was founded in 1961 and participates in both men's and women's leagues.

The team won the Westmeath Senior Football Championship in 1999, 2006 and defended their title in 2007. In the 2007 Leinster Club Football Championship they progressed as far as the final, where they were beaten by the eventual All Ireland Club champions St. Vincents of Dublin.

In 2016 & 2017, Tyrrellspass lost the county final to St. Loman's.

Senior Honours in Westmeath
Westmeath Senior Football Championship (3) 1999, 2006, 2007

Notable players
 Ger Egan, 2022 Tailteann Cup winner
 David Glennon, 2004 Leinster SFC winner
 Denis Glennon, 2004 Leinster SFC winner
 Jamie Gonoud, 2022 Tailteann Cup winner
 Nigel Harte

References

External links
 https://sites.google.com/a/gaa.ie/tyrrellspass-gaa/

Gaelic games clubs in County Westmeath
1961 establishments in Ireland